is a Japanese football player. He currently plays for Veertien Mie as Futsal and Beach Soccer.

Club career
In 2020, Moreira left for Maruyasu Okazaki after 4 years at club.

Personal life
Born in Minas Gerais, Brazil. He obtained japanese citizen.

Club statistics
.

References

External links

Profile at FC Maruyasu Okazaki
Profile at ReinMeer Aomori
Profile at Veertien Mie Futsal

1986 births
Living people
Brazilian footballers
Japanese footballers
Japanese people of Brazilian descent
Brazilian expatriate footballers
Expatriate footballers in Japan
J2 League players
J3 League players
Japan Football League players
Japan Soccer College players
Sagan Tosu players
Tokyo Verdy players
Tochigi SC players
Giravanz Kitakyushu players
Blaublitz Akita players
ReinMeer Aomori players
FC Maruyasu Okazaki players
Association football forwards
Brazilian emigrants to Japan
Naturalized citizens of Japan